The 2019 U Sports Men's Volleyball Championship was held March 15–17, 2019, in Quebec City, Quebec, to determine a national champion for the 2018–19 U Sports men's volleyball season. The tournament was played at PEPS at Université Laval. It was the 12th time that Laval had hosted the tournament, which is the most out of any program. This was also the first tournament to no longer feature an Atlantic University Sport champion as that conference had withdrawn from men's volleyball competition in 2018.

The second-seeded Trinity Western Spartans defeated the top-seeded Brandon Bobcats in a re-match of the Canada West Championship game as the Spartans won the sixth national championship in program history.

Participating teams

Championship bracket

Consolation bracket

Awards

Championship awards 
 CIS Championship MVP – Eric Loeppky, Trinity Western
 R.W. Pugh Fair Play Award – Vicente Ignacio Parraguirre Villalobos, Laval

All-Star Team 
Alexandre Obomsawin, Laval
Vicente Ignacio Parraguirre Vallalobos, Laval
Seth Friesen, Brandon
Robin Baghdady, Brandon
Jackson Howe, Trinity Western
George Hobern, Alberta
Eric Loeppky, Trinity Western

References

External links 
 Tournament Web Site

U Sports volleyball
2019 in men's volleyball
Université Laval